The Tazlăul Sărat is a right tributary of the river Tazlău in Romania. It discharges into the Tazlău in Tescani. The following towns and villages are situated along the river Tazlăul Sărat, from source to mouth: Bolătău, Zemeș, Moinești, Găzărie, Prohozești, Negreni, Șesuri, Leontinești and Ardeoani.

Tributaries

The following rivers are tributaries to the river Tazlăul Sărat:

Left: Cuț, Fărcășu, Canuș, Valea Arinilor, Ruja, Frasin, Călmuș
Right: Holmul, Piciorul Scurt, Coșnia, Lingura, Pârâul Corbului, Coacăza, Pârâul Ursului (or Ursu), Toplița, Manoli, Ariniș, Zemeș, Pârâul Sec, Pietrosul, Fundătura

References 

Rivers of Romania
Rivers of Bacău County
Moinești
Rivers of Neamț County